Rachid Alioui (born 18 June 1992) is a professional footballer who plays as a striker for  club Versailles. Born in France, he played for the Morocco national team from 2014 to 2019, scoring two goals in eighteen appearances.

Club career
On 7 July 2011, Alioui signed a one-year stagiaire (trainee) contract with Guingamp. He made his professional debut two weeks later scoring his first professional goal in a 2–0 win over Laval in the Coupe de la Ligue. A week later, he made his league debut appearing as a substitute in a 1–1 draw with Châteauroux.

On 5 July 2016, Alioui signed a three-year contract with Ligue 2 side Nîmes.

On 2 July 2019, Alioui agreed to a three-year contract with Ligue 1 club Angers. On 31 August 2021, he moved on loan to Belgian club Kortrijk.

International career
Although eligible to play for France, Alioui has appeared for Morocco at various youth levels. He was called up and capped for friendly matches against Gambia U23 and Ivory Coast U23. He made his debut for the senior team in a 1–1 friendly tie with Gabon on 3 March 2014.

Career statistics

Club

International

Scores and results list Morocco goal tally first, score column indicates score after each Alioui goal.

Honours
Guingamp
Coupe de France: 2013–14

References

External links
 
 

Living people
1992 births
French sportspeople of Moroccan descent
Sportspeople from La Rochelle
Association football forwards
Moroccan footballers
French footballers
Footballers from Nouvelle-Aquitaine
Morocco international footballers
2017 Africa Cup of Nations players
Ligue 1 players
Ligue 2 players
Championnat National 3 players
Belgian Pro League players
En Avant Guingamp players
Stade Lavallois players
Nîmes Olympique players
Angers SCO players
K.V. Kortrijk players
Moroccan expatriate footballers
Moroccan expatriate sportspeople in Belgium
Expatriate footballers in Belgium